Deep River Township is a civil township of Arenac County in the U.S. state of Michigan. The population was 2,149 at the 2010 census.  The village of Sterling is located within the township.

History
Deep River Township was organized February 28, 1873, at the time part of Bay County. John Bullock, George H. Childs and Thomas White were appointed to oversee the first township meeting on the 1st Monday in April of that year  In 1886, Adams Township was split off from Deep River Township

Geography

Demographics
As of the census of 2000, there were 2,244 people, 839 households, and 614 families residing in the township. The racial makeup of the township was 97.91% White, 0.98% Native American, 0.13% Asian, 0.13% from other races, and 0.85% from two or more races. Hispanic or Latino of any race were 2.72% of the population.

There were 839 households, out of which 34.8% had children under the age of 18 living with them, 59.6% were married couples living together, 9.1% had a female householder with no husband present, and 26.7% were non-families. 23.0% of all households were made up of individuals, and 10.6% had someone living alone who was 65 years of age or older.  The average household size was 2.54 and the average family size was 2.97.

In the township the population was spread out, with 25.4% under the age of 18, 7.2% from 18 to 24, 27.3% from 25 to 44, 23.8% from 45 to 64, and 16.4% who were 65 years of age or older.  The median age was 39 years. For every 100 females, there were 96.7 males.  For every 100 females age 18 and over, there were 92.5 males.

The median income for a household in the township was $37,457, and the median income for a family was $42,014. Males had a median income of $31,771 versus $21,944 for females. The per capita income for the township was $16,945.  About 10.4% of families and 12.1% of the population were below the poverty line, including 15.0% of those under age 18 and 7.7% of those age 65 or over.

References

Townships in Arenac County, Michigan
Townships in Michigan